UPV can refer to:

Politics
 Unión Popular Venezolana, a Venezuelan political party.
 Republic of Upper Volta, former name of the African country currently known as Burkina Faso.
 Ulster Protestant Volunteers

Educational Institutions
 University of the Philippines Visayas (UPV or UP Visayas)
 The Polytechnic University of Valencia (UPV)
 The University of the Basque Country (UPV/EHU).